FC Shakhtar Kirovsk was a football team based in Holubivka (Kirovsk), Ukrainian SSR.

History
The club appeared sometime in 1962. In 1970 Shakhtar was admitted to the Class B competitions.

Honors
Ukrainian championship for collective teams of physical culture
 Winners (1): 1969

Luhansk Oblast football championship
 Winners (1): 1968

Coaches
 1968–1969 Leonid Porosenkov

League and cup history
{|class="wikitable"
|-bgcolor="#efefef"
! Season
! Div.
! Pos.
! Pl.
! W
! D
! L
! GS
! GA
! P
!Domestic Cup
!colspan=2|Europe
!Notes
|-
|align=center|1968
|align=center|Rep
|align=center bgcolor=silver|2/4
|align=center|
|align=center|
|align=center|
|align=center|
|align=center|
|align=center|
|align=center|
|align=center|
|align=center|
|align=center|
|align=center|
|-
|align=center rowspan=2|1969
|align=center rowspan=2|Rep
|align=center bgcolor=gold|1/4
|align=center|6
|align=center|5
|align=center|1
|align=center|0
|align=center|7
|align=center|2
|align=center|11
|align=center|
|align=center|
|align=center|
|align=center|Finals
|-
|align=center bgcolor=gold|1/6
|align=center|5
|align=center|3
|align=center|2
|align=center|0
|align=center|8
|align=center|1
|align=center|8
|align=center|
|align=center|
|align=center|
|align=center bgcolor=lightgreen|Admitted
|-
|align=center|1970
|align=center|3rd 
|align=center|19/27
|align=center|40
|align=center|15
|align=center|11
|align=center|14
|align=center|34
|align=center|47
|align=center|41
|align=center|
|align=center|
|align=center|
|align=center bgcolor=pink|tier disbanded
|}

References

External links
 Shakhtar Kirovsk. lena-dvorkina.narod.ru

Football clubs in Luhansk Oblast
Defunct football clubs in Ukraine
Defunct football clubs in the Soviet Union
Mining association football teams in Ukraine
Association football clubs established in 1962
Association football clubs established in the 1970s
1962 establishments in Ukraine
1970s disestablishments in Ukraine